The 2014 African Nations Championship, known as the 2014 CHAN for short and as the Orange African Nations Championship for sponsorship purposes, was the 3rd edition of the biennial association football tournament organized by CAF, featuring national teams consisting players playing in their respective national leagues. Originally supposed to be hosted in Libya, it was held in South Africa from 11 January to 1 February 2014.

Since this edition, all results of the compositions of this competition was computed to calculate the forthcoming FIFA World Rankings.

Hosts South Africa were knocked out of the group stages owing to their national league not pausing during the tournament, as most of their clubs would not release their players. This caused CAF to alter the rules for future editions of the tournament.

Qualified nations

Draw
The CHAN 2014 official draw was conducted at the CAF Headquarters on 18 September 2013 in Egypt.

Venues
The host cities were announced on 4 May 2012. Polokwane, Bloemfontein, and Cape Town hosted the tournament. As the CEO of the LOC said: "We are not going to let the success of Orange AFCON 2013 get into our heads and we are not taking anything for granted. We are applying the same formula we used during AFCON as well as the lessons learnt to make sure that Orange CHAN 2014 delivers in accordance with our objectives as well as CAF expectations. We are still going to return to the host cities for another round of visits as the LOC, at the end of August and again in November, together with CAF again. This is how serious we take this competition. We also share the same sentiments expressed by the CAF Vice President and Deputy Secretary General of CAF and we are pleased with what we have seen so far."

Squads

Group stage
All times are local (UTC+02:00).

Tiebreakers
The teams are ranked according to points (3 points for a win, 1 point for a tie, 0 points for a loss). If tied on points, tiebreakers are applied in the following order:
Greater number of points obtained in the matches between the concerned teams;
Best Goal difference resulting from the matches between the concerned teams;
Goal difference in all group matches;
Greatest number of goals scored in all group matches;
Fair Play point system in which the number of yellow and red cards are evaluated;
Drawing of lots by CAF Organising Committee.

Group A

Group B

Group C

Group D

Knockout stage
In the knockout stage, if a match was level at the end of normal playing time, extra time was played (two periods of fifteen minutes each) and followed, if necessary, by a penalty shoot-out to determine the winner, except for the third place match, where no extra time was played.

Quarter-finals

Semi-finals

Third place match

Final

Awards
Golden Boot
 Bernard Parker (4 goals)

Player of the Tournament
 Ejike Uzoenyi

Goalscorers

4 goals

 Bernard Parker

3 goals

 Abdelsalam Omar
 Rabiu Ali
 Ejike Uzoenyi
 Yunus Sentamu

2 goals

 Bessam
 Selemani Ndikumana
 Jean-Marc Makusu Mundele
 Bonaventure Sokambi
 Kwabena Adusei
 Ibourahima Sidibé
 Mouhcine Iajour
 Mouhcine Moutouali
 Diogo António Alberto
 Ifeanyi Edeh
 Theophilus Annorbaah

1 goal

 Cyrille Bayala
 Bassirou Ouédraogo
 Fiston Abdul Razak
 Christophe Nduwarugira
 Hardy Binguila
 Rudy Ndey
 Moise Nkounkou
 Emomo Eddy Ngoyi
 Aaron Appindangoyé
 Erwin N'Guema
 Duval N'Zembi
 Daniel Cousin
 Mustapha Yahaya
 Elmutasem Abushnaf
 Faisal Al Badri
 Abdelrahman Ramadan Fetori
 Abdoulaye Sissoko
 Adama Traore
 Idrissa Traoré
 Hamidou Sinayoko
 Taghiyoulla Denna
 Ely Samba Voulany
 Brahim El Bahri
 Abdessamad Rafik
 Abdelkabir El Ouadi
 Dario Khan
 Josemar Tiago Machaisse
 Abubakar Aliyu Ibrahim
 Barnabas Imenger Jr.
 Chinonso Christian Obiozor
 Gbolahan Salami
 Uzochukwu Ugonna
 Hlompho Kekana
 Masimba Mambare
 Simba Sithole
 Kudakwashe Mahachi

Prize money
The winner of the 3rd Edition of Orange African Nations Championship in South Africa pocketed USD 750, 000 while the runner-up got USD 400,000. The Confederation of African Football (CAF) revealed the prize money ahead of the knock-out phase of CHAN 2014 tournament which took place in South Africa from 11- January till 1 February.

A total of 16 national shared $3.2 million, the rest of the prizes are as follows.

References

External links
Orange African Nations Championship, CAFonline.com

2014 African Nations Championship
2013–14 in South African soccer
International association football competitions hosted by South Africa
African Nations Championship
2014 in African football
January 2014 sports events in Africa
February 2014 sports events in Africa